The 1914 Washington State football team was an American football team that represented Washington State College during the 1914 college football season. Le by fifth-year head coach John R. Bender, the team compiled a record of 2–4, and played home games on campus at Rogers Field in Pullman, Washington.

Schedule

References

External links
 Official game program: Idaho at W.S.C. – November 7, 1914

Washington State
Washington State Cougars football seasons
Washington State football